Qezel Daraq (also known as Kyzyldara, Qezel Darreh, and Qizildara) is a village in Khanandabil-e Gharbi Rural District, in the Central District of Khalkhal County, Ardabil Province, Iran. At the 2006 census, its population was 161, in 41 families.

References 

Tageo

Towns and villages in Khalkhal County